Gennady Vasilyevich Kulik (born 1935) is a Soviet and Russian politician. He held the post of the first deputy premier of the Russian SFSR in the last years of the Soviet Union, and also was a deputy of the 1st–7th State Dumas of the Russian Federation.

Biography 
Gennady Kulik was born on 20 January 1935 in modern Pskov Oblast, Russia to a peasant family. In 1957 he graduated from the Faculty of Economics of the A. A. Zhdanov Leningrad State University. To 1965 he worked at the Novosibirsk Scientific Research Institute of Agricultural Economics.

For the next 25 years Kulik worked in the government of Soviet Russia: 1971-1986 — head of the Economic Planning Department of the Ministry of Agriculture; 1986-1988 — head of the Main Directorate for Planning and Socio-Economic Development of the Agroindustrial Complex of the RSFSR; April 1988 - August 1989 — first deputy chairman of the State Agro-Industrial Committee, then head of the same committee, ranked as Minister of the RSFSR.

Minister 
From July 1990 to July 1991 he was the First Deputy Chairman of the Council of Ministers of Russia and Minister of Agriculture and Food in the Ivan Silayev's First Cabinet. In April 1991 he signed an agreement with Nessim Gaon's Noga SA on the supply of food in exchange for oil. Litigation under this agreement had not been resolved to 2008. In July 1991 Kulik's rank in the Ivan Silayev's Second Cabinet was lowered to "ordinary" deputy premier, retaining the position of the Minister of Agriculture. In late 1991 Kulik was a member of Silayev-led Committee for Operative Management of National Economy, which acted as a provisional government of crumbling USSR.

Member of parliament 
In 1993 Gennady Kulik was elected member of the 1st State Duma. He joined the faction of the Agrarian Party of Russia. On 21 September 1998 he was appointed Deputy Prime Minister in the Yevgeny Primakov's Cabinet, supervising the agro-industrial complex.

In 1999 he was elected to the 3rd State Duma in the Kalmykia constituency. Kulik was a member of Fatherland – All Russia faction up to 2003 and deputy chairman of the Committee on Budget and Taxes. In 2002–07 — Chairman of the Committee on Agrarian Issues. Kulik resigned as a member of parliament on 11 February 2020. His seat passed to Alexey Gordeyev.

Gennady Kulik had been accused of lobbying the interests of tobacco companies. In 2002 he supported the requests of the tobacco industry to allow the sale of unsold cigarettes produced before 2001 law "On the restriction of tobacco smoking", which made warning message on the packs mandatory. In 2006 Kulik, together with MPs Ivan Savvidis and Airat Khairullin, initiated the consideration of draft "Technical regulations for tobacco products", allowing to use chemical additives banned in other countries, and making graphic warning messages unnecessary.

Awards 
 Order "For Merit to the Fatherland"
 3rd class (25 January 2010) — for merits in lawmaking and the development of Russian parliamentarism
 4th class (20 April 2006) — for active participation in lawmaking and many years of conscientious work
 Order of Honour (10 December 2001) — for high achievements in production activities, a great contribution to the strengthening of friendship and cooperation between the nations and many years of conscientious work
 Order of Friendship (26 August 2016) — for active legislative activity and many years of conscientious work
 Two Orders of the Red Banner of Labour
 Order of the Badge of Honour
 Order of the White Lotus of Kalmykia (2005)
 Honored economist of the RSFSR (11 January 1985)
 Certificate of honor of the Government of Russia (1999)

References 

1935 births
20th-century Russian economists
21st-century Russian economists
Living people
People from Pskov Oblast
Agriculture ministers of Russia
Communist Party of the Soviet Union members
Deputy heads of government of the Russian Federation
Members of the Congress of People's Deputies of the Soviet Union
First convocation members of the State Duma (Russian Federation)
Second convocation members of the State Duma (Russian Federation)
Third convocation members of the State Duma (Russian Federation)
Fourth convocation members of the State Duma (Russian Federation)
Fifth convocation members of the State Duma (Russian Federation)
Sixth convocation members of the State Duma (Russian Federation)
Seventh convocation members of the State Duma (Russian Federation)
Saint Petersburg State University alumni
Recipients of the Order "For Merit to the Fatherland", 3rd class
Recipients of the Order "For Merit to the Fatherland", 4th class
Recipients of the Order of Honour (Russia)
Recipients of the Order of the Red Banner of Labour
Agrarian Party of Russia politicians
United Russia politicians
Russian economists
Soviet economists